Calycadenia oppositifolia is a species of flowering plant in the family Asteraceae known by the common name Butte County western rosinweed. It is native primarily to Butte County, California, although a few populations have been found in other parts of the state. It grows in the foothills of the high mountain ranges.

Description
Calycadenia oppositifolia is an annual herb producing an erect, unbranching, hairy stem approaching 30 centimeters (12 inches) in maximum height. The leaves are linear in shape and up to 5 centimeters (2 inches) long, arranged oppositely about the stem. The inflorescence bears bracts coated in large resin glands and dense clusters of flower heads. The hairy, glandular flower head has a center of several disc florets surrounded by a few white or reddish triple-lobed ray florets. Each ray floret has three lobes at the tip, the middle lobe being shortest. The fruit is an achene; those developing from the disc florets have a pappus of scales.

References

External links
Jepson Manual Treatment
United States Department of Agriculture Plants Profile
photo of herbarium specimen at Missouri Botanical Garden, isotype of Calycadenia oppositifolia/Hemizonia oppositifolia
Calphotos Photo gallery, University of California

oppositifolia
Endemic flora of California
Flora of the Sierra Nevada (United States)
Natural history of the California chaparral and woodlands
Natural history of Butte County, California
Plants described in 1897
Taxa named by Edward Lee Greene